The Magic Circle is an 1886 oil painting in the Pre-Raphaelite style by John William Waterhouse. Two copies of the painting were produced. The paintings and a study depict a witch or sorceress using a wand to draw a fiery magic circle on the Earth to create a ritual space for her ceremonial magic.  As was common in the period, Waterhouse repeated his subject on a smaller scale, probably at the request of a collector.

History
The larger prime version of The Magic Circle was shown at the Royal Academy in 1886, the year after Waterhouse was elected an Associate member.  Coming after Consulting the Oracle and St. Eulalia, this was Waterhouse's third exhibit with a supernatural theme in as many years. The painting was well received at its exhibition, and was purchased for £650 the same year by the Tate Gallery, through the Chantrey Bequest. The painting was extremely successful with the critics and public alike.

The smaller 1886 version of The Magic Circle measures 88 cm (34.6 in) high and 60 cm (23.6 in) wide. It is held by a private collector. Waterhouse painted a c. 1886 study for The Magic Circle, 61.5 cm (24.2 in) high and 41.2 cm (16.2 in) wide, also held by a private collector. He initially sketched the composition in a sepia pen and ink version in 1880–1881.

The Magic Circle was on display at the National Gallery of Australia as part of the Love and Desire exhibition (December 2018 – April 2019).

Description
In a style typical of Waterhouse, the main character is a lone, female figure, placed centrally on the canvas. The surrounding landscape is hazy, as though it is not quite real, and the background figures are only discernible on close inspection, deliberately ensuring the witch is the only image of importance.

Waterhouse paid careful attention to the angles employed in this work, balancing the circle the figure is drawing around herself by the use of a triangle – her straight arm, extended by the straight stick, held out at 25 degrees to her erect body. The witch's power is emphasised by the determined face, by her exclusion of the ravens and frog – popular symbols representing magic – and by her command over the smoke pillar. Instead of billowing outwards or being affected by the wind, it remains in a straight line. A live snake ouroboros loops around the woman's neck.

The Magic Circle is similar in composition to Waterhouse's later 1916 painting, Miranda - The Tempest, which also portrays a woman associated with magic. Miranda wears a similar dress to the witch in The Magic Circle, and her face can also only be seen in profile. Unlike Frederick Sandys' portrayals of sorceresses, such as his 1864 Morgan le Fay and 1868 Medea, Waterhouse chose to make his witch's face intent and intriguing, as opposed to malevolent.

Themes
Miracles, magic and the power of prophecy are common themes in Waterhouse's art. More specifically, the notion of woman as enchantress is one that recurs in images such as Circe Offering the Cup to Ulysses (1891, Oldham Art Gallery) and Hylas and the Nymphs (1896, Manchester City Art Gallery). His oeuvre also includes a number of Middle Eastern subjects, in which he drew on the work of contemporary artists such as J. F. Lewis (1805–1876) and Lawrence Alma-Tadema (1836–1912), rather than on actual experience. This is one of Waterhouse's earlier works, and reflects his fascination with the exotic.

Theories
An article in the Pre-Raphaelite Society journal, The Review,  has hypothesised that Waterhouse may have painted an image of his own face into The Magic Circle and that the image is only viewable at a specific required distance from the painting. The article also suggests that it may have been possible to achieve that distance by viewing the painting through reversed binoculars or opera glasses. An accompanying documentary, Inside the mystery of JW Waterhouse's The Magic Circle, presents the visual argument.

In contemporary culture
Harry Furniss created a number of parodies of The Magic Circle, including one in Punch showing the actress Sarah Bernhardt tending a cauldron and another in an exhibition The Magic Circle, or There's Nothing like a Lather by Soap-and-Waterhouse.

Popular culture
The Magic Circle was part of the Harry Potter: A History of Magic exhibition at the British Library in 2017.

A reproduction of The Magic Circle is one of the paintings with an occult theme featuring in the set dressing of the TV series, The Chilling Adventures of Sabrina.

See also
 List of paintings by John William Waterhouse
 Pentacle

References

Further reading
 .
 .
 .

External links
 
 johnwilliamwaterhouse.net
 John William Waterhouse (The Art and Life of JW Waterhouse);
 John William Waterhouse (Comprehensive Painting Gallery)
 John William Waterhouse Style and Technique
 Waterhouse at Tate Britain
 Ten Dreams Galleries
 John William Waterhouse in the "History of Art"

1886 paintings
Paintings by John William Waterhouse
Collection of the Tate galleries
Witches in art
Birds in art
Snakes in art
Skulls in art
Frogs in art